Ruslan Ramilevich Kausarov (born 11 June 1996) is a Russian football player.

Club career
He made his debut in the Russian Professional Football League for FC Rubin-2 Kazan on 18 May 2015 in a game against FC Syzran-2003.

He made his Russian Football National League debut for FC Kuban Krasnodar on 5 August 2017 in a game against FC Tyumen.

References

External links
 

1996 births
Footballers from Ufa
Living people
Russian footballers
Russia youth international footballers
Association football midfielders
FC Kuban Krasnodar players
FC Rubin Kazan players